Hungary competed at the 2012 European Athletics Championships held in Helsinki, Finland, between 27 June to 1 July 2012. 21 competitors, 14 men and 7 women, took part in 13 events.

Medals

Participants

Results

Men

Track

Field

Women

Track

Field

Combined

Sources
 
 
 

Nations at the 2012 European Athletics Championships
2012
European Athletics Championships